"Suffocate" is a song by American R&B singer J. Holiday. It is the third single released from his debut album Back of My Lac'. The song was released as a digital download and sent to mainly urban radio stations. "Suffocate" debuted at number 96 on the Billboard and eventually peaked at number 18.

Music video
The music video was directed by Jonathan Mannion and premiered in late 2007. The video is set in Paris.

Chart performance
"Suffocate" debuted on the Billboard Hot 100 on the week of November 7, 2007, debuting at number 96. Six weeks later, it entered the top 40 at number 35 the week of January 5, 2008. It peaked at number 18 the week of February 23, 2008 and stayed there for two weeks. It stayed on the chart for 24 weeks. It reached number 2 on the Billboard Hot R&B/Hip-Hop Songs.

Weekly charts

Year-end charts

Certifications

References

2007 singles
2007 songs
J. Holiday songs
Capitol Records singles
Song recordings produced by Tricky Stewart
Songs written by Tricky Stewart
Songs written by The-Dream